This is a list of the members of the 21st Seanad Éireann, the upper house of the Oireachtas (legislature) of Ireland.  Unless otherwise indicated, these Senators were elected or appointed in 1997, after the 1997 general election and served until the close of poll for the 22nd Seanad at the end of July 2002.

Composition of the 21st Seanad 
There are a total of 60 seats in the Seanad. 43 Senators are elected by the Vocational panels, 6 are elected by the Universities and 11 are nominated by the Taoiseach.

The following table shows the composition by party when the 21st Seanad first met on 17 September 1997.

List of senators

Changes

See also 
Members of the 28th Dáil
Government of the 28th Dáil

References

External links 

 
21